John Rogers (born 20 June 1895 in Helston, England) was a footballer who played in The Football League for Aberdare Athletic, Sunderland and Norwich City . He also played for Crystal Palace.

References

1895 births
1977 deaths
Aberdare Athletic F.C. players
Crystal Palace F.C. players
Date of death missing
English footballers
Norwich City F.C. players
Sunderland A.F.C. players
English Football League players
Association football forwards